Deep Space Transport LLC is a joint venture that is set to provide launch services for the Space Launch System rocket. The joint venture consists of Boeing, the prime contractor for the Space Launch System core stage and the Exploration Upper Stage that will be used on Space Launch System missions, and Northrop Grumman, the prime contractor for the Space Launch System's solid rocket boosters.

Deep Space Transport LLC would be responsible for producing hardware and services for up to 10 Artemis launches beginning with the Artemis 5 mission, and up to 10 launches for other NASA missions. NASA expects to procure at least one flight per year to the Moon or other deep-space destinations. NASA is expected to issue an award by Dec. 31, 2023.

See also
 United Space Alliance, a similar entity for streamlining Space Shuttle contracts (partnership between Rockwell International and Lockheed Martin)
 United Launch Alliance, a similar entity for streamlining 21st-century United States Department of Defense launch contracts (partnership between Boeing and Lockheed Martin)

References

Space
Space missions
Space Shuttle program
NASA programs
Boeing